Dúbravica is a village and municipality of the Banská Bystrica District in the Banská Bystrica Region of Slovakia

History
In historical records, the village was first mentioned in 1400 (1400 Dubrauice, 1424 Dubrawyche) when it belonged to the castle of Slovenská Ľupča. In 1540, its mines were granted by Count János Dubravicky to Kremnica. From 1582 to 1657, it had to pay tributes to the Ottoman Empire.

References

External links
http://www.dubravica.sk/
http://www.perifernecentra.com/

Villages and municipalities in Banská Bystrica District